Musculoskeletal Tumor Surgery is a widely cited book about bone and soft tissue tumors. The author is  William F. Enneking, a tutor and leader in orthopedic oncology. It was first published by Churchill Livingstone in 1983.

Medical manuals
Oncology